Zoltán Nuridsány (August 22, 1925, Târgu Mureş (Marosvásárhely), Romania - May 22, 1974 Debrecen, Hungary) was a Hungarian-Armenian painter.

Biography
Nuridsany was born in 1925 to an Armenian father from Ani (like much of the Armenian community in Transylvania) and a Hungarian mother. His uncle Jozef Nuridsany was a famous chemist and professor. During his secondary school years he became a pillar of the Fine Arts Circle of Nandor Nagy in Budapest. His supporters considered him as a member of new generation of the European School and a promising talent. In 1948 he received a grant of the Hungarian Academy of Rome. The colors and forms he used turned the attention of a number of Italian magazines and newspapers.

In Hungary he became concerned with the theory and practices of mural art. In 1949 his monumental mosaic scheme was exhibited at the MEFESZ Exhibition. His talent was recognized by Mariusz Rabinovszky and Lajos Fulep. In 1949-1950 the "Quadriga" exhibition was founded by Ferenc Janossy, Nuridsany and others.

His well-known monumental work is "The Engineer" mosaic on the outside wall of the Engineering School in Székesfehérvár. His design won 2 awards not long before he died. In 1962 an independent exhibition was held in the Fenyes Adolf Gallery.

Nuridsany was a friend of Armenian poet Sarmen and his family. On Sarmen's invitation he visited Soviet Armenia in 1972. His apartment in Budapest has always been a center of the Armenian culture.

In 2000 Nuridsany's exhibition was opened at the National Gallery of Armenia.

Sources
Zoltan Nuridsany
One of the youth of the European School: Zoltán Nuridsány (1925-1974)

1925 births
Armenian painters
Hungarian people of Armenian descent
1974 deaths
20th-century Hungarian painters
Hungarian male painters
Romanian emigrants to Hungary
20th-century Hungarian male artists